Julia Muggenburg is a German artist and jeweller based in London. She is the founding director of Belmacz – a gallery situated in Mayfair exhibiting a range of both emerging and established contemporary artists through its annual programme of exhibitions and parallel projects.

Muggenburg's work has been reviewed by several media publications. She has been featured in Financial Times, Interview Magazine, Fad Magazine, The New York Times Magazine, Vogue US, Vogue UK, Vogue China, Vogue Russia and Vogue Italia and Nowness. The Financial Times has described her jewellery as “empowering primeval-modern ornaments for today’s cool, intellectual, urban warrior.” Whilst the AnOther has spoken of her artistic vision for Belmacz as “endlessly generous”, a way of working that draws a “global network of likeminded collaborators, artists, designers and thinkers” towards the revolutionary space.

Biography and work 
Muggenburg was born in 1970 in Mettmann, Germany, and grew up between Wuppertal and Düsseldorf. Visiting London often, Muggenburg finally settled in the UK in 1991. After attending a Christie’s postgraduate course in Ancient and Medieval Arts, Muggenburg enrolled on a course in Advanced Diploma Painting at Central Saint Martins.

In the mid-1990s, she began creating jewellery and was soon approached to make custom pieces for individuals who found a connection with her particular sensibility. In 2000, she founded Belmacz as an umbrella to launch her jewellery.

In 2000, Muggenburg founded Belmacz as an umbrella to launch her jewellery. Combining  bel (the French male adjective for beautiful) and maximum, belmacz not only references Muggenburg’s conceptual direction, but stands as a homage to the iconic 20th century jeweller Suzanne Belperron.

After exhibiting her jewellery for several years in Mount Street, Mayfair alongside artworks by London based artists, Muggenburg moved Belmacz to its current Davies Street site in 2011. Utilising this change in space, Muggenburg developed Belmacz’s artistic programme, establishing a dynamic platform that seeks to nurturing innovative artistic conversations.

In 2014, Muggenburg was invited by Alex Farquharson to present her vision at Nottingham Contemporary. Resulting in the exhibition Fourth Drawer Down explored the intersection between art, anthropology and British history. In 2016, she curated InterKontinental, an exhibition that featured the work of 17 artists from ten different countries in all forms of media.

Bridging cultures and forms of aesthetic expression, Belmacz continues to work with renowned artists with backgrounds in all genres. Recent projects include If I Was Your Girlfriend: A Jam an exhibition celebrating the life of Prince with a playlist by Jarvis Cocker and publication by Lina Viste Grønli, and A Case of Med(dling)tation a newly commissioned performative work by Sadie Murdoch and Abbas Zahedi as part of London’s inaugural Performance Exchange. In 2022 one of the gallery's artists Jakob Lena Knebl will represent Austria at the 59th Venice Biennale with her partner Ashley Hans Scheirl.

Belmacz’s artists are included in various international collations, including The National Museum of Art, Architecture and Design, Oslo (Camilla Løw), and Tate Collection, London (Abbas Zahedi).

Currently Belmacz represents: Carla Åhlander, Tim Berresheim, Coco Crampton, Michela de Mattei, Johanna Magdalena Guggenberger, Oskar Korsár, Camilla Løw, Agata Madejska, Hanna Mattes, Morten Skrøder Lund, Gernot Wieland, and Abbas Zahedi, Estate of Faramarz Zahedi.

Selected group exhibitions 
2021 – I dialogue, Kinch, Belmacz
2021 – Abbas Zahedi: 11 & 1
2020 – Paul Housley: The Poets Elbow
2020 – Slow Painting, Leeds Art Gallery (featuring Paul Housley)
2020 – Johanna Magdalena Guggenberger: Hand it Over
2019 – Jakob Lena Knebl: I am he as you are he as you are me. And we are all together
2019 – Estagon
2018 – Trimini Rising with Stanislav Filko, Luisa Gardini and Magdalena Drwiega
2018 – If I Was Your Girlfriend: A Jam 
2017 – Alpenglühen: 100 years of Ettore Sottsass Jr 
2016 – InterKontinental
2016 – The Conformist
2013 – Love Letter curated in collaboration with Zoe Bedeaux
2013 – Miss G – The Private World of Greta Garbo
2013 – Women in Love

References

External links 
Julia Muggenburg talks personal taste: Part One
Julia Muggenburg talks personal taste: Part Two
Julia Muggenburg's little black book

1970 births
Living people
Artists from London
German artists